Freiburg can refer to:
Freiburg im Breisgau, a large city in Baden-Württemberg, Germany
 University of Freiburg (Albert-Ludwigs-Universität Freiburg), an institution of higher learning founded in 1457 in Freiburg im Breisgau  
Freiburg (district), a former district in Baden-Württemberg which was merged into the district Breisgau-Hochschwarzwald in 1973
Freiburg (region), an administrative district in Baden-Württemberg
Freiburg, Lower Saxony, a municipality in the district of Stade in Lower Saxony whose full name is Freiburg an der Elbe
Fribourg, a Swiss city, whose German name is Freiburg im Üechtland
Canton of Fribourg
Świebodzice, a Polish city, whose German name is Freiburg in Schlesien
Nova Friburgo ("New Fribourg" in English), a Brazilian town named for the Swiss canton 
Fraiburgo, a southern Brazilian town that is related to Freiburg im Breisgau
SC Freiburg, a German football club in the Bundesliga
Freiburger FC, a German football club

See also
Freyburg (disambiguation)
Freiberg (disambiguation)
Fryeburg, Maine
Friberg
Fribourg (disambiguation)
Freiburger (disambiguation)